Cash or Share Option is a specialized form of warrant where the settlement is either cash or physical delivery of shares depending if the option expires in the money or out of the money. 

Normally, the holder of the certificate receives the exercise price in cash when option is in the money, that is price of the underlying at expiry is equal or above the exercise price, and physical delivery of the underlying when the option is out of the money, that is the price of the underlying at expiry is below the exercise price. Then the holder is the one giving the option.

Options (finance)
Equity securities